The Comstock–Needham system is a naming system for insect wing veins, devised by John Comstock and George Needham in 1898. It was an important step in showing the homology of all insect wings. This system was based on Needham's pretracheation theory that was later discredited by Frederic Charles Fraser in 1938.

Vein terminology

Longitudinal veins
The Comstock and Needham system attributes different names to the veins on an insect's wing. From the anterior (leading) edge of the wing towards the posterior (rear), the major longitudinal veins are named:
costa C, meaning rib
subcosta Sc, meaning below the rib
radius R, in analogy with a bone in the forearm, the radius
media M, meaning middle
cubitus Cu, meaning elbow
anal veins A, in reference to its posterior location

Apart from the costal and the anal veins, each vein can be branched, in which case the branches are numbered from anterior to posterior. For example, the two branches of the subcostal vein will be called Sc1 and Sc2.

The radius typically branches once near the base, producing anteriorly the R1 and posteriorly the radial sector Rs. The radial sector may fork twice.

The media may also fork twice, therefore having four branches reaching the wing margin.

According to the Comstock–Needham system, the cubitus forks once, producing the cubital veins Cu1 and Cu2. 
According to some other authorities, Cu1 may fork again, producing the Cu1a and Cu1b.

As there are several anal veins, they are called A1, A2, and so on. They are usually unforked.

Crossveins
Crossveins link the longitudinal veins, and are named accordingly (for example, the medio-cubital crossvein is termed m-cu). Some crossveins have their own name, like the humeral crossvein h and the sectoral crossvein s.

Cell terminology
The cells are named after the vein on the anterior side; for instance, the cell between Sc2 and R1 is called Sc2.

In the case where two cells are separated by a crossvein but have the same anterior longitudinal vein, they should have the same name. To avoid this, they are attributed a number. For example, the R1 cell is divided in two by the radial cross vein: the basal cell is termed "first R1", and the distal cell "second R1".

If a cell is bordered anteriorly by a forking vein, such as R2 and R3, the cell is named after the posterior vein, in this case R3.

References

External links
North–Carolina state University course on insect wings

Insect anatomy
Conceptual systems